Everly is a city in Clay County, Iowa, United States. The population was 575 in the 2020 census, a decline from 647 in 2000.  The Ocheyedan River flows to the south and west of the city. Famous people born here include Vern Fear.

History
Everly was founded as Clark in 1884, but soon took its current name because there was already a Clarke,Iowa. Everly incorporated on April 7, 1902.

Geography
Everly's longitude and latitude coordinates in decimal form are 

Demographics

2010 census
As of the census of 2010, there were 603 people, 270 households, and 171 families residing in the city. The racial makeup of the city was 99.7% White, 0.2% Native American, and 0.2% from two or more races. Hispanic or Latino of any race were 1.0% of the population.

There were 270 households, of which 30.4% had children under the age of 18 living with them, 51.5% were married couples living together, 7.0% had a female householder with no husband present, 4.8% had a male householder with no wife present, and 36.7% were non-families. 32.6% of all households were made up of individuals, and 13.7% had someone living alone who was 65 years of age or older. The average household size was 2.23 and the average family size was 2.82.

The median age in the city was 42.8 years. 23.4% of residents were under the age of 18; 5.3% were between the ages of 18 and 24; 23.6% were from 25 to 44; 29.4% were from 45 to 64; and 18.4% were 65 years of age or older. The gender makeup of the city was 51.4% male and 48.6% female.

2000 census
As of the census of 2000, there were 647 people, 277 households, and 185 families residing in the city. The racial makeup of the city was 99.23% White, and 0.77% from two or more races.

There were 277 households, out of which 31.4% had children under the age of 18 living with them, 56.0% were married couples living together, 7.2% had a female householder with no husband present, and 32.9% were non-families. 30.3% of all households were made up of individuals, and 15.9% had someone living alone who was 65 years of age or older. The average household size was 2.34 and the average family size was 2.89.

In the city, the population was spread out, with 26.3% under the age of 18, 7.4% from 18 to 24, 24.3% from 25 to 44, 25.2% from 45 to 64, and 16.8% who were 65 years of age or older. The median age was 39 years. For every 100 females, there were 97.3 males. For every 100 females age 18 and over, there were 95.5 males.

The median income for a household in the city was $35,278, and the median income for a family was $41,458. Males had a median income of $30,192 versus $21,375 for females. The per capita income for the city was $15,996. About 1.7% of families and 3.0% of the population were below the poverty line, including 4.5% of those under age 18 and none of those age 65 or over.

Education
Clay Central–Everly Community School District operates public schools serving the community. It was a part of the Everly School District until July 1, 1993, when it merged with Clay Central into Clay Central–Everly.

Formerly the Fire Department and City Hall, the library is situated on the east side of Main Street.

Notable residents
Francis H. Case, U.S. Senator from South Dakota born in Everly
Vern Fear, professional baseball player who was born in Everly
Wattie Holm, professional baseball player who resided in Everly
Connie Kunzmann, six-on-six basketball player for Everly High School 
Waldo Wegner, Iowa State basketball player born in Everly

References

External links

 
City-Data Comprehensive statistical data and more about Everly

Cities in Clay County, Iowa
Cities in Iowa